Christopher William Harper (born 19 August 1977) is an actor and director who played Nathan Curtis in ITV soap Coronation Street in a high profile teenage grooming and exploitation storyline.

Television drama performances
Harper has appeared in British dramas including The Suspicions of Mr Whicher, Upstairs Downstairs, Life on Mars and most notably as playing Clifford Last, son of Victoria Wood's character Nella Last in the multiple BAFTA award winning ITV television film Housewife, 49. He also starred as Trixie Franklin's brother Geoffrey in the series 12 finale of Call The Midwife.

Stage performances
As a stage actor he has played Benedick in Much Ado About Nothing for Shakespeare's Globe Theatre, a season of Sir Alan Aykbourn plays at The Royal & Derngate Theatre, Northampton (directed by Ayckbourn himself) and many other plays at the Crucible Theatre, Hampstead Theatre and The Old Vic, London.

Charity work
Harper has helped raise awareness of child sex abuse through charity work and as patron for the charity Voicing CSA, which helps adult survivors of child sexual abuse to speak out.

Personal life
He married actress Emily Bowker in 2013. They live in London.

References

External links

British male stage actors
1977 births
Living people
British male soap opera actors